Walter Tyler may refer to:

 Wat Tyler, 14th century British rebellion leader
 Walter H. Tyler (1909–1990), American film art director